Jacques Baptiste Lebrun (20 September 1910 – 14 January 1996) was a French sailor. He competed at the 1932, 1936, 1948, 1952 and 1960 Olympics and won a gold medal in the snowbird event in 1932. He missed the 1956 Games for financial reasons.

Lebrun was a boat designer and eventually became technical director of the national sailing association. During World War II he helped to hide a significant part of the Louvre collection from the Germans.

References

External links
 
 
 
 

1910 births
1996 deaths
Olympic sailors of France
Olympic gold medalists for France
Olympic medalists in sailing
French male sailors (sport)
Sailors at the 1932 Summer Olympics – Snowbird
Sailors at the 1936 Summer Olympics – O-Jolle
Sailors at the 1948 Summer Olympics – Swallow
Sailors at the 1952 Summer Olympics – Finn
Sailors at the 1960 Summer Olympics – 5.5 Metre
Medalists at the 1932 Summer Olympics